Pazarspor is a Turkish sports club located in the town of Pazar in Rize Province. The football club plays in the TFF Second League. It was founded in 1973 by the people of Rize, Pazar.

Current squad

Out on loan

References

External links 
Official website
Pazarspor on TFF.org

 
Sport in Rize
Football clubs in Turkey
Association football clubs established in 1973
1973 establishments in Turkey
Pazar, Rize